

Yob, yobbo, yobs, or variants thereof may refer to:

Language
 Yob (slang), a pejorative slang term for 'an uncouth youth' in British English
 Yoba language, once spoken on New Guinea (ISO 639-3:yob)

People with the surname Yob
 Chuck Yob (born 1937), American politician
 Gregory Yob (1945–2005), American computer game designer

Arts and entertainment

Music
 Yob (band), an American doom metal group
 "Yob" (song), 1998, by TISM
 The Boys (UK band), also known as "The Yobs"

Other media
 "The Yob", a 1988 Comic Strip Presents... television episode
 Yobs, a comic strip by Tony Husband in satirical news magazine Private Eye

Other uses
 Youth On Board, U.S. nonprofit organization founded in 1994
 Year of birth